Wildcat is the fourth and final studio album by the Australian power pop group, Sunnyboys. It was released in August 1989 on RCA Records, and peaked at No. 63 on the Australian ARIA Albums Chart.

Background
Sunnyboys were formed in 1980 and released three studio albums until their split in 1984. In 1987, member Jeremy Oxley subsequently reformed a version of The Sunnyboys with himself as the only original member and released Wildcats. This version of Sunnyboys disbanded in 1990.

Track listing

Personnel
Sunnyboys
 Jeremy Oxley – guitar, vocals
 Cathy Ogden – backing vocals 
 Mary Azzopardi – backing vocals 
 Phil Smith – bass
 Peter Hincenbergs – drums
 Nick Freedman – guitar
 Timothy Freedman – keyboard
 David Steele – mandolin

Charts

Release history

References

1989 albums
Sunnyboys albums
RCA Records albums